The King Long Jockey, King Long Saima, or King Long Kaite (凯特) is a light commercial vehicle (van) built by King Long from China as a van, chassis cab, Recreational vehicle, and minibus.

Overview

The King Long Jockey was introduced in China in June 2014 with prices up to 236,000 yuan. Power of the King Long Jockey comes from either a 2.8 litre inline-four turbo diesel engine or a 2.3 litre inline-four turbo diesel engine.

Controversies
The designs of the King Long Jockey vans are controversial as they heavily resemble the Mercedes-Benz Sprinter vans with similar body styles and overall vehicle dimensions. The King Long Jockey vans are among the various Chinese vans from domestic brands that chose to replicate the Mercedes-Benz Sprinter with only minor styling differences. Other brands include Higer and JAC.

References

External links

Official website

Vehicles introduced in 2014
Minibuses
Vans
Rear-wheel-drive vehicles
2010s cars
Jockey